Cimitero delle Ballodole (The Cemetery of the Ballodole) was in Florence in the homonymous resort, about a mile south of the current Cimitero di Trespiano.

The Ballodole (the popular contraction of Val di Lodole) was the first cemetery created in Florence for the burial of ordinary people outside the churches. It was opened in 1775, anticipating the Napoleonic reforms, extending the small cemeteries of Santa Lucia to Trespiano and San Pietro to Careggi. According to Sisto da Pisa the place was used for the low people of Florence since the middle ages.

In 1783, following the law of the Tuscan government forbidding future tumulations in churches and regulating burial grounds, it was closed, moving the cemetery site to the new cemetery of Trespiano, which opened on 1 May 1784.

In the Florentine jargon there has been the way to say "andare alle Ballodole", which means "to die" or, to translate, to become miserable.

References 
 Foresto Niccolai (edited by), The urns of the strong, monuments and burial inscriptions , Coppini Tipografi, Florence, September 1997

Cemeteries in Florence